General Campos is a town in the center-east of the Province of Entre Ríos, Argentina.It is located about 35 km west of the Uruguay River and 220 km east from the provincial capital Paraná. The town was founded on June 8, 1913.

References
 
 Official website.

Populated places in Entre Ríos Province